Scouting in Northern Ireland is represented by three Scouting associations. The Scouts NI is part of The Scout Association of the United Kingdom, which is the World Organization of the Scout Movement (WOSM) recognized Scouting association in the United Kingdom. Scouting Ireland is the national Scouting association and the WOSM-recognized Scouting association for the Republic of Ireland, although its membership extends to Northern Ireland. The Baden-Powell Scouts' Association is a member of the World Federation of Independent Scouts and operates one group in Northern Ireland.

Overview 
The Scout Association has seven Scout Counties covering the 6 counties that make up Northern Ireland plus the City of Belfast. These counties are overseen by the Northern Ireland Scout Council, known as "Scouts NI", which is a registered charity in Northern Ireland with charity number 103542. The Scout Association, Northern Ireland was an observer member of the Federation of Irish Scout Associations (FISA).

Scouting Ireland is part of Northern Scout Province and has five Scout Counties. The Northern Province Commissioner is currently Wendy Morrow. During the Troubles the number entering the Catholic Boy Scouts of Ireland skyrocketed as parents were eager for their sons to participate in Scouting rather than join the Provisional IRA like many young men of the time.

The Northern Ireland Scout Council and Scouting Ireland has run a Scout Citizenship project to improve the relationship between the two Scouting associations in Ireland.

History

120 Northern Ireland Scouts, along with 12 leaders, took part in the 21st World Scout Jamboree to celebrate the 100th anniversary of Scouting at Hylands Park near Chelmsford, Essex in 2007.

Scout Counties

The Scout Association

County Antrim

The Scout County of County Antrim covers the County of Antrim in Northern Ireland.  The three Scout Districts are Lisburn & District, South East Antrim and Slemish. Prior to the recent merger the four Scout Districts were Antrim and District, Lisburn and District, Mid Antrim, South East Antrim. Slemish District was formed in April 2017 with the merging of Antrim District and Mid Antrim District.

County Armagh

The Scout County of County Armagh covers the County of Armagh in Northern Ireland. The three Scout Districts are Lurgan and District, Armagh and District, and Portadown.

City of Belfast

The Scout County of City of Belfast covers the City of Belfast.  The four Scout Districts are East Belfast, North Belfast, Lagan and West Belfast.

County Down

The Scout County of County Down covers the County of Down in Northern Ireland. The three Scout Districts are Strangford, South Down and North Down. The county has a current membership of 2279 young people and 445 adults. North Down district has a dedicated headquarters and training facility in Balloo Industrial Estate, Bangor.

County Fermanagh

The Scout County of County Fermanagh covers the County of Fermanagh in Northern Ireland. The county has no Districts and has nine Scout Groups. The County Commissioner is Katrina Armstrong. The county has a current membership of 437 young people and 128 adults.

County Londonderry

The Scout County of County Londonderry covers the city of Derry and the surrounding county of Londonderry in Northern Ireland. The three Scout Districts are Coleraine, Londonderry and Mid Ulster.

County Tyrone

The Scout County of County Tyrone covers the County of Tyrone in Northern Ireland. The four Scout Districts are Clogher Valley, Dungannon, Omagh, and Strabane.

Scouting Ireland

Brian Boru Scout County

Brian Boru Scout County covers parts of County Armagh and County Tyrone with a total of 9 Groups.
1st Armagh (Armagh)
8th Armagh (Portadown)
12th Armagh (Slieve Gullion)
1st Down (Rostrevor)
1st Dromore (Newry)
5th & 6th Dromore (Lurgan)
7th Dromore (Craigavon)
1st Tyrone (Dungannon)
6th Tyrone (Cookstown)
14th Tyrone (Pomeroy)

Down & Connor Scout County

Down & Connor Scout County covers County Antrim, County Down and Belfast with a total of 15 Groups. The 2006 Phoenix National Patrol Challenge was held at Tollymore Forest Park Co. Down.

Erne Scout County

Erne Scout County covers County Fermanagh with a total of 7 Groups.

Errigal Scout County

Covers part of Counties Tyrone, Londonderry and Donegal with a total of 17 Groups.

North East Ulster Scout County

Covers part of counties Tyrone, Londonderry and Antrim with a total of 9 Groups.

Camp sites

The Scout Association
 Ardnavally located in Belfast. Owned and run by Lagan District Scout Council. Also houses the HQ of The Northern Ireland Scout Council (NISC)
 Baronscourt is a campsite in Newtonstewart, County Tyrone. It is on the Baronscourt Estate.
 Crawfordsburn is the Northern Ireland Scout Centre, 12 miles from Belfast. Adjacent to the Crawfordsburn Country Park, it consists of 22 acres (9 hectares) of camping ground including several accommodation buildings. It is a National Scout Activity Centre. Originally part of the Sharman estate, it opened for Scout camping in October 1948.
 Cladagh Glen Scout Centre is run by Fermanagh Scout Council.
 Tipperary Wood Campsite is run by 1st Newcastle Scout Group from Newcastle, County Down runs.

Scouting Ireland
 Castle Saunderson is being developed as a cross-border Scout campsite on the border of County Cavan and County Fermanagh. While it is in the Republic of Ireland, the estate has an entrance in both Northern Ireland and the Republic of Ireland.

Sections
For details of sections in The Scout Association see The Scout Association Sections. Within Northern Ireland there was an affiliated feeder organisation, The Northern Ireland Squirrel Association, (NISA) which was for young people aged four and five years living in Northern Ireland. Following the launch of the Squirrel section across the UK in September 2021, NISA Dreys were be merged into Scout Association Groups in the Province.
For details of sections in Scouting Ireland see Scouting Ireland Sections.
Beaver Scouts started in The Scout Association in Northern Ireland in 1965. Scouts Ireland started the section with considerable help from the Scout Association in 1979.
For details of sections in the Baden-Powell Scouts' Association see B-PSA Organisation.

See also 

 The Scout Association
 Scouting Ireland
 Scout merit badge (Ireland)
 Girlguiding Ulster

References

External links
 Scouts NI

Scouting and Guiding in Ireland
The Scout Association